Raymond Grew (born October 28, 1930) is a social historian of France and Italy and a Professor of History Emeritus at the University of Michigan.

Grew graduated from Harvard University in 1951 and received a Ph. D. from Harvard in 1957. During this period, on August 16, 1952, he married Daphne Merriam in Cambridge, Massachusetts.

Major publications

References 

21st-century American historians
American male non-fiction writers
Harvard University alumni
Living people
University of Michigan faculty
1930 births
21st-century American male writers